Muzaffar al-Din Jahan Shah ibn Yusuf (1397 in Khoy or 1405 in Mardin – 30 October or 11 November 1467 in Bingöl)) was the leader of the Qara Qoyunlu Oghuz Turkic tribal confederacy in Azerbaijan and Arran who reigned c. 1438 – 1467. During his reign he managed to expand the Qara Qoyunlu's territory to its largest extent, including Eastern Anatolia, most of present-day Iraq, central Iran, and even eventually Kerman. He also conquered neighbouring states. He was one of the greatest rulers of the Qara Qoyunlu. He was also allegedly fond of drinking and entertainment. During his reign Jahan Shah had the Gökmedrese and Muzafferiye theological schools constructed in his capital city Tabriz.

During reign of Qara Yusuf 
He was sent to retake Soltaniyeh and Qazvin just before his father's death.

During reign of Qara Iskander
Around 1420 Jahan Shah married the daughter of Alexios IV of Trebizond and Theodora Kantakouzene, part of the agreement being that Alexius would continue paying to the Qara Qoyunlu the tribute that Trebizond had formerly paid to Timur. During the reign of his brother Qara Iskander (1420–36), as a potential rival to the throne, Jahan Shah’s life was not safe and he took refuge with his other brother Ispend who was ruling Baghdad. In 1436 he obtained the help of the Timurid ruler Shah Rukh to defeat Qara Iskander and seize the throne for himself. Having been helped to power by Shah Rukh he ruled at first as a vassal of the Timurids. He was also adopted by Goharshad Begum and crowned on 19 April 1438, along taking epithet "Muzaffar al-Din".

Campaigns against Georgia
In 1440, King Alexander I of Georgia refused to pay tribute to Jahan Shah. In March Jahan Shah responded by invading Georgia with 20,000 troops, destroyed the city of Samshvilde and sacked Tbilisi before returning to Tabriz. He was accompanied by Shaykh Ibrahim, father of future Shaykh Junayd. He also mounted a second military expedition against Georgia in 1444. His forces met those of Alexander’s successor, King Vakhtang IV at Akhaltsikhe, but the fighting was inconclusive and Jahan Shah returned to Tabriz once more.

Conquest of Baghdad
Jahan Shah’s brother Ispend, who had ruled over Baghdad and its environs for twelve years, died in 1445 and he bequeathed the government of the state to his nephew Alvand Mirza since his son Fulad Mirza was too young at the time. However most of the emirs preferred Fulad. He decided to organise a military expedition against Baghdad with the backing of some of the emirs, who had sought refuge with him. After a siege of seven months, Baghdad was captured on 9 June 1446. He also appointed his nephews Alvand Mirza, Rustam, Tarkhan and Mahmud to jointly govern Mosul. He appointed his son Mirza Muhammad to govern Baghdad in his name.

Reign
Upon the death of the Timurid ruler Shah Rukh in 1447, Jahan Shah became an independent ruler of the Qara Qoyunlu, and started to use the titles of sultan and khan. At the same time, the Timurid Empire took advantage of the struggles among the Turkoman princes and captured the cities of Sultaniya and Qazvin. Peace was made when Sultan Muhammad bin Baysonqor was married to a daughter of Jahan Shah. However, he retook lands he lost from Mirza Babur. He appointed his son Pirbudag to govern Isfahan in 1452. In the summer of 1458, he advanced as far as Herat, but had to turn back soon because of a revolt by his son Hasan Ali and also because Abu Said's march on Tabriz.

Hasan Ali was kept in Maku prison for a while for his rebellious nature. He was defeated in winter 1458. But this time, his son Pirbudag rebelled, who was soon joined by Hasan Ali in Fars. However, he was spared at the request of his mother and replaced by Mirza Yusuf, another son of Jahan Shah. Pirbudag was sent to govern Baghdad, his other sons Qasim beg was assigned to Kerman with Hasan Ali being imprisoned again. However, Pirbudag again rebelled, now controlling Baghdad. He was defeated in 1464 and was executed by Mirza Muhammad.

Conflict with the Aq Qoyunlu

Conflict with Jahangir 
From around 1447 Jahan Shah was involved in a struggle against the Ak Koyunlu who had always been sworn enemies of the Qara Qoyunlu. First of these battles happened when Alvand Mirza rebelled and fled to Jahangir, chief of Ak Koyunlu. Jahan Shah demanded his rebellious nephew, but Jahangir refused to hand him over. Jahan Shah invaded Erzincan and sent his commander - Rustem beg to subdue Jahangir. Hopeless Jahangir sent his mother Sara Khatun to Mamluk Egypt while Jahan Shah started to support his half-brother Sheikh Hasan. While Sheikh Hasan was killed by Uzun Hasan, brother of Jahangir; Jahan Shah hasted to offer peace to Ak Koyunlu, in return to accept their submission. Jahangir accepted and also wed his daughter to Mirza Muhammad.

Conflict with Uzun Hasan 
Uzun Hasan did not acknowledge his elder brother's submission and rebelled against him, capturing Amid in 1457. Jahangir fled to Jahan Shah. Uzun Hasan was also supported by Safavids, their leader Shaykh Junayd being brother-in-law to Uzun Hasan. He was replaced by Shaykh Jafar - his uncle.

Jahan Shah set out from Tabriz with a great army on 16 May 1466, and came to the basin of Lake Van. While there, he was furious to learn that Uzun Hasan was raiding his lands with 12,000 cavalry. Meanwhile, Uzun Hasan, suspecting that Jahan Shah was planning to attack him, had carefully guarded the mountain passes. Envoys went back and forth between them, but because of Jahan Shah’s heavy demands, an agreement could not be reached. Having advanced as far as Muş, Jahan Shah had to postpone his attack because of the onset of winter. As his troops began to complain, he decided to withdraw to a winter residence. Uzun Hasan caught his army by surprise and totally defeated them in a sudden attack. Mirza Yusuf and Mirza Muhammad was captured on 30 October or 11 November 1467 at the Battle of Chapakchur. Jahan Shah was killed in battle while fleeing. and with his death the great era of Qara Qoyunlu history came to an end. He was succeeded by his son Hasan Ali. Jahan Shah had been buried in southern part of Blue Mosque, Tabriz.

Legacy
In the year 1462, Abd al-Razzaq described Jahan-shah's rule in the following terms: "Owing to the benevolent administration (husn-i 'inayat va lutf-i atifat) of Mirza Jahan-shah, Azarbaijan was a highly thriving state. That well-meaning sovereign was anxious to practice justice, to secure prosperity of the country, and to treat his subjects honourably. The capital, Tabriz, by its numerous population and the prevalence of tranquility, emulated Egypt (misr-i jami). The rumours of the good behaviour of that felicitous king spread throughout the world. The inhabitants of his God-protected kingdom, indifferent to the arrows of events, enjoyed peace".

Jahan Shah, along with being a poet, promoted culture, learning and architecture. Using the pseudonym "Haqiqi", Jahan Shah wrote poetry in Azerbaijani Turkic and Persian.  In 1447 he married his daughter to a descendant of the famous mystic Shah Nimatullah Vali whom the Shia revered as a saint and a worker of miracles.

Family 
He was married several times. Known marriages include: a daughter of Alexios IV of Trebizond and Jan Begüm (daughter Tajuddin Rajab bin Afridun):

Sons 

 Pirbudag - governor of Isfahan and Fars, then Baghdad. Killed by Mirza Muhammad.
 Hasan Ali - succeeded his father.
 Mirza Muhammad - was son-in-law to Jahangir Beg. Captured on 11 November 1467 at the Battle of Chapakchur and executed.
 Mirza Yusuf - captured on 11 November 1467 at the Battle of Chapakchur and blinded. Executed by Ughurlu Muhammad on 22 October 1469.
 Qasim beg

Daughters 

 Saliha Khatun
 Habiba Khatun
 Tutuq 'Ismat, married to Sultan Muhammad, Timurid ruler
 A daughter married to descendant of Nimatullah Vali

References and notes

Sources

Azerbaijani-language poets
1467 deaths
People from Tabriz
People from Khoy
Qara Qoyunlu rulers
Year of birth uncertain